Puerto Escondido is a 1992 Italian comedy film directed by Gabriele Salvatores. For this film Diego Abatantuono and Renato Carpentieri were awarded with Silver Ribbons for best actor and best supporting actor.

Plot 
In a bank of Milan, the banker Mario Tozzi is involved in an ambush against him: he is hit by two shots in the bathroom of the building, and as soon as he recovers from convalescence, believing that his assailant intends seriously to kill him, Mario decides to run away from Italy, taking refuge in Mexico. Mario chooses the small and remote land of Puerto Escondido, where he meets two very nice Italians, fled there a long time ago to escape from the frantic life of the city. They are Alex and Anita, which Mario makes friends right away, and he fits in a short time in the life of that place. However, since the money is not there, the three companions try to get away using illegal methods. One night Mario meets in that port his assailant, who is also suffering at the cruel life of the city. In fact, he decides to convert to the peace of Puerto Escondido.Become four now, the comrades plan a heist that will guarantee them at least a year of peace; however the project ends badly...

Cast 
 Diego Abatantuono: Mario Tozzi
 Claudio Bisio: Alex
 Valeria Golino: Anita
 Renato Carpentieri: Police Commissioner Viola
 Antonio Catania: Di Gennaro
 Fabrizio Bentivoglio: Mario from Caserta
 Ugo Conti: Friend of Alex and Anita

References

External links

Puerto Escondido at Variety Distribution

1992 films
Films directed by Gabriele Salvatores
Italian comedy films
1992 comedy films

Colorado Films films
1990s Italian films